The Robert S. Pierson is a bulk carrier built for and operated on the North American Great Lakes.

The vessel went through several owners and several names.
In 2007, she was sold to Lower Lakes Towing, a Canadian company. Her last namesake was Robert Scott Pierson, the founder of the shipping firm Soo River Company. An earlier vessel named after Pierson operated from 1980 to 1982.

When first commissioned in 1974 she was owned by the Union Commerce Bank, of Cleveland, Ohio.
She was operated by Oglebay Norton Company and named the Wolverine. For the next 32 years, she was operated by various divisions of Oglebay Norton.  

Oglebay Norton assumed ownership of the vessel in 1994. In 2006, Oglebay Norton sold off its entire fleet to the Wisconsin and Michigan Steamship Company. In 2008, the vessel and two sister ships, the David Z. Norton and the Earl W. Oglebay were acquired by Grand River Navigation, for $20 million.  Grand River then sold the Wolverine to its Canadian partner, Lower Lakes Towing of Port Dover, Ontario. It was at this point she was renamed the Robert S. Pierson.

The Holland Sentinel, commenting on the sale, reported that the change of ownership to Canadian hands would prevent the vessel from visiting Holland, Michigan, formerly a major port of call, "as U.S. cabotage laws limit the ability of foreign-flagged vessels to make deliveries here."

The vessel was not built to seawaymax dimensions, she was specifically designed to navigate "Cleveland's winding Cuyahoga River".
Her capacity is just under 20,000 tons.

On March 20, 2017, the Pierson was the first ship upbound in the Welland Canal, and the captain received the Top Hat at the Lock 3 Centre in St Catharines, Ontario.

References

External links

1974 ships
Great Lakes freighters
Ships built in Lorain, Ohio